Lawrence J. Rosati (January 20, 1918 - September 15, 1997) was an American football coach. He served as the head football coach at Muhlenberg College in 1945. Rosati then moved to Moravian College, where he was the head football coach from 1946 to 1950.

Head coaching record

References

1918 births
1997 deaths
American football defensive backs
American football quarterbacks
Moravian Greyhounds football coaches
Moravian Greyhounds football players
Muhlenberg Mules football coaches